Erigeron sionis is a North American species of flowering plant in the family Asteraceae known by the common name Zion fleabane. It has been found in the southwestern United States, only in southern Utah. Some of the populations are inside Zion National Park, after which the species is named.

Erigeron sionis  grows in shallow soil in open woodlands dominated by pine, juniper, Douglas fir, maple, and oak. It is a perennial, colony-forming herb up to 25 cm (10 inches) tall, spreading by means of stolons running along the surface of the ground. The inflorescence generally contains 1-4 flower heads. Each head contains 22–46 white ray florets surrounding many yellow disc florets.

Varieties
Erigeron sionis var. sionis 
Erigeron sionis var. trilobatus (Maguire ex Cronquist) S.L.Welsh

References

sionis
Flora of Utah
Plants described in 1947
Flora without expected TNC conservation status
Taxa named by Arthur Cronquist